Sukmanovka is the name of several rural localities in Russia:
Sukmanovka, Kursk Oblast, a village in Uspensky Selsoviet of Kastorensky District of Kursk Oblast
Sukmanovka, Tambov Oblast, a selo in Sukmanovsky Selsoviet of Zherdevsky District of Tambov Oblast